Americus is the county seat of Sumter County, Georgia, United States. As of the 2020 census, the city had a population of 16,230. It is the principal city of the Americus Micropolitan Statistical Area, a micropolitan area that covers Schley and Sumter counties and had a combined population of 36,966 at the 2000 census.

Americus is the home of Habitat for Humanity's international headquarters, Georgia Southwestern State University, the Windsor Hotel, The Fuller Center for Housing's international headquarters, The Rosalynn Carter Institute for Caregivers, Cafe Campesino, and many other organizations. The city is notable for its rich history, including a large business and residential historic district, and its close proximity to Jimmy Carter National Historic Site, Andersonville National Historic Site, and Koinonia Farm.

Geography
Americus is located at  (32.075221, -84.226602).

Climate

History

Early years
For its first two decades, Americus was a small courthouse town. The arrival of the railroad in 1854 and, three decades later, local attorney Samuel H. Hawkins' construction of the only privately financed railroad in state history made Americus the eighth largest city in Georgia into the 20th century. It was known as the "Metropolis of Southwest Georgia," a reflection of its status as a cotton distribution center.

In 1890, Georgia's first chartered electric street car system went into operation in Americus. One of its restored cars is on permanent display at the Lake Blackshear Regional Library, a gift from the Robert T. Crabb family who acquired the street car in the 1940s.

The town was already graced with an abundance of antebellum and Victorian architecture when local capitalists opened the Windsor Hotel in 1892. A five-story Queen Anne edifice, it was designed by a Swedish architect, Gottfried L. Norrman, in Atlanta. Vice-President Thomas R. Marshall gave a speech from the balcony in 1917, and soon to be New York Governor Franklin D. Roosevelt spoke in the dining room in 1928.

On January 1, 1976, the city center was listed on the National Register of Historic Places as the Americus Historic District. The district boundaries were extended in 1979.

Into the 20th century
For the local minority community, Rev. Dr. Major W. Reddick established the Americus Institute (1897–1932). Booker T. Washington was a guest speaker there in May 1908. Rev. Alfred S. Staley was responsible for locating the state Masonic Orphanage in Americus, which served its function from 1898 to 1940. Both men engineered the unification of the General Missionary Baptist Convention of Georgia in 1915, the former as president and the latter as recording secretary. The public school named in honor of A.S. Staley was designated a National School of Excellence in 1990.

Two other colleges were also established in Americus, the Third District Agricultural and Mechanical School in 1906 (now Georgia Southwestern State University), and the South Georgia Trade and Vocational School in 1948 (now South Georgia Technical College). South Georgia Technical College is located on the original site of Souther Field.

In World War I, an Army Air Service training facility, Souther Field (now Jimmy Carter Regional Airport), was commissioned northeast of the city limits. Charles A. Lindbergh, the "Lone Eagle," bought his first airplane and made his first solo flight there during a two-week stay in May 1923. Recommissioned for World War II, Souther Field was used for RAF pilot training (1941–1942) as well as US pilot training before ending the war as a German prisoner-of-war camp. The town was incorporated in 1832, and the name Americus was picked out of a hat.

Shoeless Joe Jackson served as the field manager for the local baseball team after his banishment from professional baseball. A plaque at Thomas Bell Stadium commemorates his contribution to the local baseball program.

Americus and the Civil Rights Movement
Koinonia Farm, an interracial Christian community, was organized near Americus in 1942. Founder Clarence Jordan was a mentor to Millard and Linda Fuller, who founded Habitat for Humanity International at Koinonia in 1976 before moving into Americus the following year. In 2005, they founded The Fuller Center for Housing, also in Americus. Koinonia Farm is currently located southwest of Americus on Hwy. 49.

The Civil Rights Era in Americus was a time of great turmoil; violent opposition to Koinonia by racist elements led to the bombing of a store uptown in 1957. Rev. Dr. Martin Luther King Jr. spent a weekend in the courthouse jail in 1961, after an arrest in Albany. The "Sumter Movement" to end racial segregation was organized and led by Rev. Joseph R. Campbell in 1963. As a direct result, two Georgia laws were subsequently declared unconstitutional by a federal tribunal meeting in Americus. Color barriers were first removed in 1965 when J.W. Jones and Henry L. Williams joined the Americus police force. Lewis M. Lowe was elected as the first black city councilman ten years later. With their election in 1995, Eloise R. Paschal and Eddie Rhea Walker broke the gender barrier on the city's governing body.

In 1971, the city was featured in a Marshall Frady article, "Discovering One Another in a Georgia Town", in Life magazine. The portrayal of the city's school integration was relatively benign, especially considering the community's history of troubled race relations. Americus' nadir in this respect had occurred in 1913, when a young black man named Will Redding was lynched by a white mob. A group of young African Americans were standing on the corner of Cotton Avenue and Lamar Street. One of those men was Will Redding. Police chief Barrow ordered them to move away from the corner, all complied except Redding.  The chief tried to arrest him and a struggle ensued. Redding was then hit with the chief's gun, after which Redding grabbed the gun and shot the police chief. He was then chased down, shot, and put in jail. An angry mob went into the jail and tore down the door to Redding's cell. When the door was completely torn down, the mob dragged him out onto Forsyth street and beat him to death with crow bars and hammers.

Demographics

2020 census

As of the 2020 United States census, there were 16,230 people, 6,162 households, and 3,557 families residing in the city.

2000 census
As of the census of 2000, there were 17,013 people, 6,374 households, and 4,149 families residing in the city. The racial makeup of the city was 39.05% White, 58.26% African American, 0.23% Native American, 0.86% Asian, 0.01% Pacific Islander, 0.90% from other races, and 0.69% from two or more races. Hispanic or Latino people of any race were 2.49% of the population.

There were 6,374 households, out of which 32.8% had children under the age of 18 living with them, 34.2% were married couples living together, 27.4% had a female householder with no husband present, and 34.9% were non-families. 29.6% of all households were made up of individuals, and 10.5% had someone living alone who was 65 years of age or older. The average household size was 2.52 and the average family size was 3.14.

In the city, the population was spread out, with 28.0% under the age of 18, 14.1% from 18 to 24, 26.1% from 25 to 44, 18.0% from 45 to 64, and 13.7% who were 65 years of age or older.  The median age was 30 years. For every 100 females, there were 79.4 males.  For every 100 females age 18 and over, there were 70.4 males.

The median income for a household in the city was $26,808, and the median income for a family was $32,132. Males had a median income of $27,055 versus $20,169 for females. The per capita income for the city was $14,168.  About 23.4% of families and 27.7% of the population were below the poverty line, including 44.1% of those under age 18 and 19.8% of those age 65 or over.

Economy

Largest employers
According to the City's 2009 Comprehensive Annual Financial Report, the largest employers in the area were:

Education

Primary and secondary schools 
The Sumter County School District holds grades pre-school to twelfth, which consist of one primary school and one  elementary school, two middle schools, and two high schools. The district has 353 full-time teachers and over 5,774 students.

Elementary schools:
Sumter County Primary School
Sumter County Elementary School
Sumter County Intermediate School

Secondary schools:
Sumter County Middle School
Americus-Sumter Ninth Grade Academy
Americus-Sumter County High School

K-12 charter school:
Furlow Charter School

K-12 private school:
Southland Academy

Higher education 
Georgia Southwestern State University
South Georgia Technical College

All schools and colleges are accredited by the Southern Association of Colleges and Schools (SACS).

Public libraries

The community has the Lake Blackshear Regional Library, a part of the Lake Blackshear Regional Library System. It was temporarily relocated to a shirt factory warehouse also located in Americus after the tornado in 2007, but, once the reconstruction of the library finished around 2012, it was moved back to its original place.

2007 tornado
Americus was hit by an EF3 tornado around 9:15 pm on March 1, 2007. It destroyed parts of Sumter Regional Hospital, forcing the evacuations of all of the patients there. There were two fatalities at a Hudson Street residence near the hospital; all SRH patients were evacuated safely. The hospital, however, faced major reconstruction issues and was eventually torn down. A new hospital, Phoebe Sumter, opened at a new location on the corner of US 19 and Highway 280 in December 2011.

Georgia Governor Sonny Perdue said, "It was worse  I had feared. The hospital was hit, but the devastation within the area of Sumter County and Americus was more than I imagined. The businesses around the hospital are totally destroyed. Power is still not restored in many places. It's just a blessing frankly that we didn't have more fatalities than we did." Over 500 homes were affected, with around 100 completely destroyed.  Several businesses throughout the town were seriously damaged or destroyed as well. Among the businesses suffering major damage were Winn Dixie supermarket, Wendy's, Zaxby's, McDonald's, Domino's Pizza, and several local businesses. The Winn Dixie was completely destroyed. Domino's Pizza has since reopened, as well as Winn Dixie, which soon closed down, a Harvey's opening in its place.

President George W. Bush visited the area on March 3, calling what he saw "tough devastation."

Notable people
 Griffin Bell
 Mike Cheokas - politician
Brent Cobb
Howell Cobb
Philip Cook
Charles F. Crisp
Charles R. Crisp
Cassandra Pickett Durham
Lonne Elder III
Millard Fuller
Chan Gailey
Jimmy Garrison
Victor Green
Kent Hill
George Hooks
Alonzo Jackson
Eddie Jackson
Otis Leverette
Angel Martino
Joanna Moore
Ruby Muhammad
James Nabrit Jr.
Leonard Pope
Dan Reeves
Mo Sanford

Baseball
There have been eight minor league teams that have represented the city of Americus during 20 seasons spanning 1906–2002. Since classification of the minors began, seven of them have been labeled as class D loops and one played in an independent league. Several ballplayers for Americus teams subsequently played in the major leagues.

Tourism
 Georgia Rural Telephone Museum - Leslie
 Georgia Veterans State Park - Lake Blackshear
 Jimmy Carter National Historic Site - Plains
 Habitat for Humanity Global Village and Discovery Center - Americus

Gallery

References

External links
 City website
 Community website
 Americus (in the New Georgia Encyclopedia)
 The Americus Newsletter
 Americus Sumter Chamber of Commerce
 South Georgia Historic Newspapers Archive, Digital Library of Georgia
 Americus Movement, Civil Rights Digital Library
 

1832 establishments in Georgia (U.S. state)
Cities in Georgia (U.S. state)
County seats in Georgia (U.S. state)
Americus, Georgia micropolitan area
Historic districts on the National Register of Historic Places in Georgia (U.S. state)
Cities in Sumter County, Georgia
National Register of Historic Places in Sumter County, Georgia